The FREMM (French: Frégate Européenne Multi-Mission; Italian: Fregata Europea Multi-Missione), which stands for "European multi-purpose frigate", is a Franco-Italian family of multi-purpose frigates designed by Naval Group and Fincantieri. In France, this surface combatant is known as the "Aquitaine class" (17 units planned, of which 9 were later cancelled), while in Italy it is known as the "Bergamini class" (10 units planned). The lead ship of the class, was commissioned in November 2012 by the French Navy. Italy has ordered six general purpose and four anti-submarine variants. France, on the other hand, has ordered six anti-submarine variants and two air-defense ones.

The FREMM has also been exported to various countries. Notably, the United States Navy selected a FREMM variant for their new  of 20 frigates, to be built by Fincantieri, starting with a $795 million contract for the lead ship.

Background
Three original variants of the FREMM were proposed; an anti-submarine variant (ASW) and a general-purpose variant (GP) and a land-attack variant (AVT) to replace the existing classes of frigates within the French and Italian navies. A total of 27 FREMM were to be constructed (17 for France and 10 for Italy) with additional aims to seek exports. However, budget cuts and changing requirements saw this number drop significantly for France, while the order for Italy remained unchanged. The land-attack variant (AVT) was subsequently cancelled.

A third anti-air warfare variant of FREMM was proposed by DCNS in response to French requirements for a new air-defence frigate, the new variant became known as FREDA ("FREgates de Défense Aériennes", "Air defence frigate"). This new French requirement was due to the third and fourth s being cancelled after the first two cost €1.35B each, but this decision left French Navy still in-need of replacements for its ageing  air-defence frigates.

As of 2009, the FREDA design features a more powerful version of the Héraklès passive electronically scanned array radar and 32 cells of SYLVER A50 vertical launch system in place of the 16 cells of A43 and 16 cells of A70. The SYLVER A50 would allow it to fire the -range Aster 30 missile. While at one point it was determined that the towed array sonar would not be fitted, this has subsequently been retained on the FREDA design.

At Euronaval 2012 DCNS showed a new concept called FREMM-ER for the FREDA requirement, again based on the FREMM, but specifically mentioning the ballistic missile defence mission as well as anti-air. FREMM-ER has a modified superstructure replacing Héraklès with the new Thales Sea Fire 500 radar, whose four fixed plates resemble those of the US Navy's AN/SPY-1. However, unlike the Héraklès and the SPY-1 (both using passive electronically scanned array technology), the Sea Fire 500 has active electronically scanned array antennas.

Italy
Planning assumptions for the Italian Navy are ten FREMM-IT (four ASW variants and six GP variants) at a cost of €5.9 billion.

In the 2013 Italian budget, the Italian government laid out the necessary financing for two more GP variants (FREMM-IT 7 & 8) and the contract was awarded in September 2013. On 15 April 2015, the Italian Parliament confirmed the deal between OCCAR and Orizzonte Sistemi Navali Spa (Fincantieri and Finmeccanica, since 2017 Leonardo) to begin building units 9 and 10, for 764 million Euros.

As of 16 April 2015, the Italian government has approved funding for all ten FREMM-IT to be delivered to the Italian Navy (four ASW variants and six GP variants). FREMM-IT 9 & 10 will have undisclosed enhanced capabilities. All ten Italian FREMM-ITs have extended AAW capabilities, with SAAM-ESD CMS, Aster 30 and Aster 15 missiles for extended area defence. SAAM-ESD CMS use Leonardo MFRA, a 3D active radar (AESA), an evolved version of the Leonardo EMPAR PESA radar (previously embarked on Horizon-class destroyers and the ). Since the seventh FREMM-IT, there will be updates, such as new conformal IFF antenna and much more stealth response. Since the ninth FREMM-IT, SCLAR-H was replaced with Leonardo ODLS-20. In 2017 the Italian FREMM refit started with the installation on each of two SITEP MS-424 acoustic guns.

In 2020 it was reported that Italy would sell its last two FREMM-class frigates in the current production line (Spartaco Schergat and Emilio Bianchi) to Egypt. Spartaco Schergat was in the final stage of her sea trials while Emilio Bianchi would follow within one year. The deal reportedly also involved other military equipment and was worth 1.2 billion Euros. It was reported that Italy would then order two additional FREMM frigates to replace those transferred to Egypt with the anticipated delivery of the replacements by 2024.

France
In November 2005 France announced a contract of €3.5 billion for development and the first eight hulls, with options for nine more costing €2.95 billion split over two tranches (totaling 17).

Following the cancellation of the third and fourth of the Horizon-class frigates in 2005 on budget grounds, requirements for an air-defence derivative of the FREMM called FREDA were placed – with DCNS coming up with several proposals. Expectations were that the last two ships of the 17 FREMM planned would be built to FREDA specifications; however, by 2008 the plan was revised down to just 11 FREMM (9 ASW variants and 2 FREDA variants) at a cost of €8.75 billion (FY13, ~US$12 billion). The 11 ships would cost €670 million (~US$760m) each in FY2014, or €860m (~US$980m) including development costs.

The 2013 White Paper on Defence and National Security committed France to 15 front-line frigates, which was initially interpreted as 2 Horizons, 5 s and a reduction in the FREMM fleet down to 8 ships. The 2014–2019 defence plan restated a target of 11 frigates; of which six ASW FREMM variants would be delivered to replace the Georges Leygues-class frigates by 2019, followed by two anti-air variants to replace the ageing Cassard-class frigates and a decision was to have been taken in 2016 on what version the remaining three would be. In 2014, the French Navy's Chief of Staff, Admiral Bernard Rogel, confirmed that 11 FREMM frigates had been ordered but in 2015 the order was cut to 8 in order to allow for the introduction of five FTI mid-Size frigates from 2024. The FTI will replace the La Fayette class in "first-rank" roles, with three of the La Fayettes also being fitted with active sonar and other improvements so as to extend their service life into the early 2030s.

On 16 April 2021 the French Navy received Alsace, the first of the two air defence FREMM frigates ordered. Besides being equipped with Aster 15 and Aster 30 surface-to-air missiles, the ship holds Exocet MM 40 anti-ship missiles and the MU 90 torpedo system.

Export

United States

On 10 July 2017, it was reported that the United States Congress was interested in foreign designs such as the Fincantieri FREMM for the US Navy's FFG(X) Program. According to Representative Rob Wittman, chairman of the United States House Armed Services Subcommittee on Seapower and Projection Forces, the US Congress was comfortable with models such as Fincantieri's partnership with Lockheed Martin to build the  version of the littoral combat ship (LCS). If the Italian FREMM design is selected, the Marinette Marine shipyard in Wisconsin, part of the Fincantieri group, would build the guided-missile frigates. Marinette Marine is best known for the US Navy Freedom-class LCS. On 16 February 2018, Fincantieri Marine was one of five companies awarded a $15 million contract for conceptual design of FFG(X), which the Navy would evaluate over 16 months ahead of a final request for proposal in 2019 and contract award in 2020.

On 30 June 2017, it was announced that Leonardo and BAE Systems will collaborate to provide the US military forces with a wide range of upgraded munitions for advanced, large-calibre weapon systems such as the Leonardo Vulcano and Strales/DART guided munitions.

From late May to early June 2018, the Italian Navy deployed Alpino on a good will visit to the United States along the Eastern seaboard, making port calls in Norfolk, Baltimore, New York City, and Boston. She was visited by several US Navy officials who toured her as a potential FFG(X) candidate. Among the visitors was the Italian Ambassador to the United States, Armando Varrichio.

On 30 April 2020, the US Navy announced that Fincantieri had been awarded a $795 million contract for the first FFG(X), to be built at Fincantieri Marinette Marine in Marinette, Wisconsin. The contract includes options for an additional nine ships, which, if all options were exercised, would value the contract at $5.5 billion. On 7 October 2020, US Secretary of the Navy Kenneth Braithwaite announced that first FFG(X) frigate would be named .

Egypt
Egypt ordered two Italian FREMM frigates in 2020 and one French FREMM frigate in 2015. The initial Italian sale might be followed by the subsequent acquisition of two additional FREMM frigates by Egypt.

On 16 February 2015, the Egyptian Navy ordered one FREMM vessel to enter service before the opening of the New Suez Canal, as part of a larger deal (including 24 Dassault Rafale aircraft and a supply of missiles) worth US$5.9 billion (€5.2 billion). In order to keep to Egypt's deadlines, France offered to send Normandie, originally intended for the French Navy. The SYLVER A70 VLS and NETTUNO-4100 jamming equipment were removed due to export limitations for such sensitive equipment. The crew will be around 126 sailors compared to 108 in the French Navy. The SATCOM antenna for the French Syracuse satellites was also taken down; however, Egypt will use its own military telecommunications satellite, supplied by Airbus Defence and Space and Thales Alenia Space, in conjunction with its naval vessels. From March 2015, DCNS trained the Egyptian crew in the technology of the ship and DCNS and its partners accompanied the crew for a period of 15 months. On 23 June 2015, French naval shipbuilder DCNS transferred the FREMM frigate Tahya Misr (ex-Normandie) to the Egyptian Navy. A ceremony took place to transfer Normandie, renamed Tahya Misr ("Long Live Egypt") to Egypt, in the presence of General Sedki Sobhy, the Egyptian Minister of Defense, Jean-Yves Le Drian, the French Minister of Defense, Admiral Osama Rabie, Egyptian Navy Commander in Chief, Admiral Bernard Rogel, the French Chief of Navy and Hervé Guillou, Chairman & CEO of DCNS. In April 2021, the second FREMM Bergamini-class frigate, ENS Bernees, joined the Egyptian Navy. The first one joined on 31 December 2020.

Morocco
On 24 October 2007, it was announced that the Royal Moroccan Navy had ordered one FREMM to replace its . The contract was signed on 18 April 2008 and construction of the Moroccan FREMM began in the summer 2008 with delivery expected in 2012 or 2013; Mohammed VI was launched in September 2011 and handed over on 30 January 2014. The Moroccan ship is similar to the French anti-submarine version, without SYLVER A70 tubes for SCALP Naval, and cost €470m.

Indonesia 
On 10 June 2021, Indonesia signed a contract with Fincantieri for the order of six FREMM frigates and two Maestrale-class frigates and other logistical support. There may be collaboration between PT-PAL Shipyard on Java and Fincantieri.

Unsuccessful bids

Canada
In April 2013, the French government showcased the FREMM class in Halifax, Nova Scotia, with the hope of selling to the Royal Canadian Navy for the Single Class Surface Combatant Project.

In September 2017, a variant of the FREMM was offered directly to the Ministry of Defence, in an attempt to protect intellectual property. This direct bid included delivery of the first ship in 2019 if accepted within the year and a fixed price of $30 billion for all 15 ships, versus the $62 billion estimated for the government's prime-contractor ship building plan. In December 2017 the offer was rejected by the Public Services and Procurement Canada, citing the unsolicited nature of the bid as undermining the fair and competitive nature of the procurement". In October 2018, the Type 26 design was chosen by Canada as the winner of the program. On 8 February 2019, a contact was signed by Canada to build Type 26 vessels.

Australia
In April 2016, Prime Minister Malcolm Turnbull confirmed that the Italian FREMM class was one of three frigates shortlisted for the Royal Australian Navy's  replacement. In September 2016, Fincantieri signed a contract to participate in the Competitive Evaluation Process, conducted by the Department of Defence for nine Future Frigates for the Royal Australian Navy. In June 2018, the contract was awarded to BAE Systems to produce nine s.

Brazil
In January 2019, the Italian government made an offer of two Bergamini-class frigates to the Brazilian Navy. The frigates Spartaco Schergat and Emilio Bianchi under construction for the Italian Navy, would be transferred to Brazil for €1.5 billion (R$6.37 billion).

Greece
On 22 January 2009 the Hellenic Navy announced an order for six FREMM to replace an equal number of s. After the Greek government-debt crisis this was cut down to between two and four ships equipped with SCALP Naval, with France alleged to have offered them to Greece at no cost for the first five years. Germany objected to this deal in October 2011 and no deal has been signed. In February 2013 though and during the formal visit of the President of France, François Hollande, in Athens, according to press reports an agreement which includes the long-term leasing of two FREMM frigates (Normandie and Provence according to initial reports) to the Hellenic Navy has been reached. On 12 January 2018 the Greek daily newspaper Kathimerini reported that the Greek government was set to enter talks with France regarding the procurement of two FREMM frigates, with an option for an additional two. Contacts between Greece and France were to begin initially at a military level, starting in February 2018. In April 2018, Greek deputy Minister for National Defence Fotis Kouvelis stated that an agreement between France and Greece was reached for a five-year lease of two FREMM frigates, which could have been handed over as early as August 2018. After a few days, on 25 April 2018 the Greek minister of Defense Panos Kammenos denied any information regarding the purchase of two frigates from France. Eventually, Greece abandoned all plans for the purchase of FREMMs in 2019 and pursued with the smaller FDI Belharra multi-purpose frigates, offered by Naval Group.

Country-specific equipment

Common equipment
 Leonardo OTO Melara /62 calibre gun (compact for FR-ASW/Super Rapid gun with Davide/Strales guided ammunition for IT-ASW)
 2 × torpedo launchers Eurotorp/WASS B515/3 for MU 90 torpedoes with Calzoni AHS (Automatic Handling System)
 1 × Leonardo NA-25 DARDO-F fire control system for the 76 mm cannon
 2 × SLAT (Systeme de Lutte Anti-Torpille) anti-torpedo system (into Italian Navy only for ASW version) ASW DLS (Anti Submarine Weapon Decoy Launcher System) based on Thales ALERT sonar system, DCNS RATO command system and WASS CMAT weapon system (with 12 tube launcher for 127 mm's WASS C-310 decoy and jammers)
 NH90 helicopter, with capability for AW101, Cougar and Caracal
 Thales UMS 4110 CL hull sonar
 Thales UMS 4249 CAPTAS4 towed sonar (Italian anti-submarine versions only; fitted to both French ASW and air defence variants)
 Thales TUUM-6 Underwater Telephone
 2 × Sigen MM/SMQ-765 EW system: with JASS (Jamming Antenna Sub System) ECM, Nettuno 4100, by ELT Elettronica and Thales ESM (Communications and Radar ESM)
 2 × SOFRESUD Quick Pointing Devices "QPD"

French-specific equipment

 16-cell MBDA SYLVER A43 VLS for MBDA Aster 15 missiles (in first four ASW variants)
 The last two ASW variants have been fitted with a 16-cell MBDA A50 VLS for MBDA Aster 30 to be used if deemed necessary. 
 The two AAW variants fitted with 32-cell A50 VLS.
 MBDA Exocet MM40 Block 3, (Block 3c variant - naval and land-attack capability - entering service with the French Navy from December 2022)
 2 × Nexter  Narwhal remote weapon systems
 NGDS decoy launcher
 Héraklès radar
 Terma Scanter 2001 radar
 Thales Artemis IRST
 SETIS combat system
 Sagem Najir fire control system for the 76mm gun (on French ASW variants)
 Thales STIR EO MK 2 fire control radar for 76mm gun (on French AAW variants)
 4 × torpedo launchers Eurotorp/WASS B515/3 for MU 90 torpedoes
 Samahé helicopter handling system

Italian-specific equipment

 16-cell MBDA SYLVER A50 VLS for MBDA Aster 15 missiles and MBDA Aster 30 missiles
 Leonardo IRST SASS
 another one Leonardo NA-25 DARDO-F fire control system for the second cannon (76 mm/62 calibre or /54 calibre gun)
 Leonardo Kronos Grand Naval (MFRA) AESA, 3D, C band radar
 Leonardo RASS (RAN-30X-I) surface radar (OTH)
 Leonardo SPS-732, 2D LPI Surveillance X band radar (surface and air surveillance at low level); since the seventh FREMM-IT replaced by more powerful Leonardo SPS-732(V2)
 Leonardo SPN-730 LPI navigation radar and two navigation radar GEM-Elettronica MM/SPN-753
 Leonardo SPN-720 radar for helicopter precision approach
 Leonardo IFF SIR M-E; since the 7th FREMM-IT replaced with Leonardo IFF SIR M5-PA with phased array antenna
 Leonardo Athena combat system (CMS), with 21, three displays, MFC (Multi Functional Consolle): 17 into COC, 2 in backup COC, 1 on bridge and 1 into Command Planning Room
 Leonardo SAAM-ESD extended area AAW combat system (for Aster 15 and Aster 30 missiles)
 2 × Leonardo (OTO Melara) SCLAR-H DLS Multipurpose Rocket Launcher; from the ninth vessel replaced with Leonardo ODLS-20
 GP version: 8 × MBDA Teseo Mk-2/A, for naval and land attack missiles
 ASW version: 4 × MBDA Teseo Mk-2/A missiles and 4 × MBDA MILAS anti-submarine missiles
 2 × OTO Melara - Oerlikon KBA /80 calibre remote weapon system, controlled by close CMS
 Curtiss-Wright TC-ASIST helicopter handling system (for both helicopters)
 Leonardo (WASS) SNA-2000-I mine avoidance sonar
 L-3 ELAC Nautik SeaBeam 3050, multi-beam echo sounder (only on ASW version)
 1 ×  rigid-hulled inflatable boat release and recovery lateral systems (Stemar , FNM HPEP  engine, 6 crew)
 1 ×  rigid-hulled inflatable boat release and recovery lateral systems (Zodiac Hurricane)
 1 × 11m rigid-hulled inflatable boat fast, stern release and recovery system (only on GP version, for CABI Cattaneo CABAT boat)
 ASW version: 2 × Leonardo OTO Melara 76 mm/62 calibre Davide/Strales CIWS guns, one on the hangar (both with Strales guided ammunition)
 2 × acoustic guns / LRAD SITEP MASS CS-424: since year 2017, on update works

Ships of the class

See also
 List of naval ship classes in service
 
 
 
 
 MKS 180 frigate
 Type 31 frigate

References

External links

 FREMM Aquitaine class Frigate - DCNS(Navy recognition)
 French Navy Official Page 
 Italian Navy Official Page 
 Detail, story and image on Italian FREMM 
 FREMM Greece 
 Esercitata l'opzione per la nona e la decima FREMM

 
Frigate classes
Marina Militare
Frigates of the Royal Moroccan Navy
Frigates of the French Navy
Frigates of the Italian Navy
Frigates of the Egyptian Navy
Stealth ships
Ship classes of the French Navy